Halotydeus is a genus of earth mites in the family of Penthaleidae, first described by Antonio Berlese in 1891.

Pest status
They are a major winter pest of a variety of crops and pastures in southern Australia.

Species
There are just four species which occur in Australia:
Halotydeus bakerae Qin & Halliday, 1996
Halotydeus castellus Qin & Halliday, 1996
Halotydeus destructor (Tucker, 1925)
Halotydeus spectatus Qin & Halliday, 1996

References

Taxa described in 1891
Trombidiformes genera
Taxa named by Antonio Berlese